Angola–Congo border may refer to:

Angola–Democratic Republic of the Congo border
Angola–Republic of the Congo border.